Koolhaas is a Dutch surname. Notable people with the surname include:

 Anton Koolhaas (1912–1992), Dutch journalist, novelist, and scenario writer
 Rem Koolhaas (born 1944), Dutch architect
 Caspar Koolhaas (1536–1615), Reformed theologian

See also
 Kohlhase

Dutch-language surnames